Crowds and Power is a 1960 book by Elias Canetti, dealing with the dynamics of crowds and "packs" and the question of how and why crowds obey power of rulers. Canetti draws a parallel between ruling and paranoia. Also, the memoirs of Daniel Paul Schreber are analyzed with an implicit critique of Sigmund Freud and Gustave Le Bon.

The book was translated from German into English by Carol Stewart in 1962 and published by Gollancz.

Overview
Although wide-ranging in its erudition, this essay is not scholarly or academic in a conventional way. Rather, it reads a bit like a manual written by someone outside the human race explaining to another outsider in concise and highly metaphoric language how people form mobs and manipulate power. However, Canetti also uses "we" in his text and does not dissociate from humanity. Unlike much non-fiction writing, it is highly poetic and seething with anger.

On asking questions:
"On the questioner the effect is a feeling of enhanced power. He enjoys this and consequentially asks more and more questions; every answer he receives is an act of submission. Personal freedom consists largely in having a defense against questions. The most blatant tyranny is the one which asks the most blatant questions."

This work remains important for the insights it provided into the Eastern European upheaval which can be understood within the framework Canetti puts forth. Showing the growth of crowds and their power against even the power of the state.

Notes

Bibliography
 

 
 
McClelland, John: "The Place of Elias Canetti's Crowds and Power in the History of Western Social and Political Thought." Thesis Eleven 1996 45: 16–27.
 

1960 non-fiction books
Books about crowd psychology
Books by Elias Canetti
German non-fiction books
Victor Gollancz Ltd books
Books about political power